Otto Suhonen (8 June 1895 – 19 August 1954) was a Finnish gymnast. He competed in nine events at the 1924 Summer Olympics.

References

External links
 

1895 births
1954 deaths
Finnish male artistic gymnasts
Olympic gymnasts of Finland
Gymnasts at the 1924 Summer Olympics
People from Uurainen
Sportspeople from Central Finland
20th-century Finnish people